Panzer Pranks, WWII as it actually was in the movies is a 1980 board wargame published by Chaosium.

Gameplay
Panzer Pranks is a comedic combat simulation game, which satirizes the conventions of standard board wargames.

Reception
Joseph M. Hurst reviewed Panzer Pranks in The Space Gamer No. 28. Hurst commented that "This game is a lot more fun to read than to play. It is a satire on simulation mania, and uses both rapier and bludgeon freely and sometimes simultaneously."

Reviews
White Wolf #43 (May 1994)

References

External links

Board games introduced in 1980
Board wargames with artwork by Rodger B. MacGowan
Chaosium games